Stenomorda tetraspilota is a species of beetle in the genus Stenomorda of the family Mordellidae. It was described in 1895.

References

Mordellidae
Beetles described in 1895